The Osismii, Ossismii, or Ostimii (also Ossismi, Osismi) were a Gallic tribe dwelling in the western part of the Armorican Peninsula (modern Brittany) during the Iron Age and the Roman period.

Etymology 
They are mentioned as Osismos and Osismi (var. ossismi) by Caesar (mid-1st c. BC), O̓sísmioi (Ὀσίσμιοι) by Strabo (early 1st c. AD), Ossismos by Pliny (1st c. AD), O̓sismíous (Ὀσισμίους; var. Ὀσίσμιοι, Ὀσισμαίους) by Ptolemy (2nd c. AD), and as Osismis in the Notitia Dignitatum (5th c. AD). According to Strabo, the Massaliote explorer Pytheas, who travelled to northwestern Europe in the late 4th century BC, reported the variant Ōstimíous (Ὠστιμίους), which seems to be the earliest attested form of the name, documented before the Gaulish sound shift -st- > -ss- occurred.

The Gaulish ethnonym Ostim(i)i (sing. Ostim(i)os) literally means 'the ultimate', that is to say 'the remotest people', 'those who dwell at the extremity of the Armorican Peninsula'. It derives from the Celtic stem ostim- ('ultimate, extreme'), itself from an earlier *postim- ('last'; cf. Lat. postumus 'last-born, final'). In Middle French, the territory they occupied was known as (Fine) Posterne.

Geography 

The territory of the Osismii was located at the extremity of the Brittany Peninsula, west of the Veneti and Coriosolites.

Pytheas situated the Osismii at the end of the peninsula of Kabaïon, which is not clearly identifiable today. This could be related to large peninsula of Cap-Sizun, on the southern-western coast of Finistère, just before reaching the difficult maritime pass of Pointe du Raz where the waters of the Atlantic Ocean and of the English channel are joining; this peninsula offers to the south a natural safe harbour in the aber and bay of today's town of Audierne, as well as in the bay of today's Douarnenez, to the north of the peninsula. Other hypotheses situate it in the small peninsula of Kermorvan in today's commune of Ploumoguer and bordering the ria of Le Conquet, but the whole peninsula of Crozon with its large bays and safe harbors is not excluded, even if it does not extend to the westernmost point.

Their chief town was Vorgium (present-day Carhaix).

History 
They submitted to Caesar during the Gallic Wars, in 58 BC, but took part in an insurrection against Rome in 56 BC.

References

Primary sources

Bibliography

Further reading 
 Smith, Julia M. H. Province and Empire: Brittany and the Carolingians. Cambridge: Cambridge University Press, 1992.

See also
 Veneti (Gaul)
 List of Celtic tribes

 
Historical Celtic peoples
Gauls
Tribes of pre-Roman Gaul
Tribes involved in the Gallic Wars
Armorica